Svetlana Akhatovna Khabirova (original name: Светлана Ахатовна Хабирова; born  in Sterlitamak) was a Russian weightlifter, competing in the 75 kg category and representing Russia at international competitions.

She participated at the 2000 Summer Olympics in the 75 kg event. 
She competed at world championships, at the 2002 World Weightlifting Championships.

Major results

References

External links
 

1978 births
Living people
Russian female weightlifters
Weightlifters at the 2000 Summer Olympics
Olympic weightlifters of Russia
People from Sterlitamak
World Weightlifting Championships medalists
Sportspeople from Bashkortostan
20th-century Russian women
21st-century Russian women